All at Sea may refer to:

Film
 All at Sea (1929 film), an American film starring Karl Dane
 All at Sea (1933 film), an American short film starring Ethel Barrymore
 All at Sea (1935 film), a British film starring Googie Withers
 All at Sea (1940 film), a British film starring Sandy Powell
All at Sea (1977 film), an Australian TV movie
All at Sea (2011 film), an Italian film starring Gigi Proietti
 An alternative name for the 1957 British film Barnacle Bill, starring Alec Guinness
 An alternative name for the 2010 Norwegian film Wide Blue Yonder, starring Brian Cox

Television
 All at Sea (TV series), a British television series set in a B&B
 Timothy Spall: All at Sea, a British TV series following his journey "round the British Isles" in a barge
 "All at Sea", a Thomas and Friends season 3 episode

Other uses
 All at Sea (ruleset), a naval ruleset for the Games Workshop
 "All at Sea", a song from the album Twentysomething by Jamie Cullum
 All At Sea (horse) (1989–2007)